is a Prefectural Natural Park in northern Chiba Prefecture, Japan. First designated for protection in 1935, the park's central feature is the Tone River. The park spans the municipalities of Katori and Kōzaki.

See also
 National Parks of Japan

References

External links
  Map of Ōtone Prefectural Natural Park

Parks and gardens in Chiba Prefecture
Protected areas established in 1935
1935 establishments in Japan